Campedelli is an Italian surname. Notable people with the surname include:

 Dominic Campedelli (born 1964), American ice hockey player
 Nicola Campedelli (born 1979), Italian footballer and manager

See also 
 Campedelli surface

References 

Italian-language surnames